The Apprentice Australia was an Australian reality television series which aired on the Nine Network. It was based on NBC's The Apprentice. It first aired on 28 September 2009 and last aired on 23 November 2009, and features Mark Bouris, the founder and chairman of Wizard Home Loans and Yellow Brick Road, as the chief executive officer (CEO). It is narrated by Andrew Daddo, and the series' winner received a one-year employment contract worth $200,000 at a job managing Bouris' newest business venture, Yellow Brick Road.

Candidates

Weekly results

 The candidate was on the winning team.
 The candidate was on the losing team.
 The candidate was hired and won the competition.
 The candidate won as project manager on his/her team.
  The candidate lost as project manager on his/her team.
 The candidate was brought to the final boardroom.
 The candidate was fired.
 The candidate lost as project manager and was fired.

Challenges

Week 1
Project managers:  Carmen ('Eventus') and Morello ('Pinnacle')
Task: Operate a premier gardening service and secure commercial and residential contracts.
Result: Pinnacle made a $1700 profit against Eventus's $1100. While Pinnacle had problems with their time management and was forced to cancel their residential bookings, Eventus undersold several of their contracts and were warned that an attempt to reneg on the tasks they had agreed to do at one booking was unprofessional.
Winner: Pinnacle
Reward: Spa day at The Observatory Hotel
Brought into the boardroom: Carmen, Sabrina, Jane
Fired: Jane, for failing to defend herself against criticism brought by her teammates in the Boardroom, and for not speaking up against what she saw as errors in Carmen's leadership.

Week 2
Project managers:  Sabrina ('Eventus') and Lynton ('Pinnacle')
Task: Create a brand for a children's cereal (including tagline, logo, product box, costumed mascot and advertising jingle) and present a successful pitch to marketing executives at Ogilvy Advertising.
Result: While both teams created successful brands, Eventus won due to presenting a pitch with greater energy and team involvement, while Pinnacle's pitch was seen as flat and unengaging.
Winner: Eventus
Reward: Cocktails and dinner at the Ivy Hotel with a corporate public speaker.
Brought into the boardroom: Lynton, John, Sam
Fired: Lynton, for being too controlling and delivering a poor quality presentation, in which he forgot the name of a key panellist.  Bouris considered Lynton was  'Machiavellian' and 'manipulative' in his boardroom selections.

Week 3
Team changes: Amy moved to Pinnacle. Gavin moved to Eventus
Project managers:  Gavin ('Eventus') and Amy ('Pinnacle')
Task: Create an original flavour of pie and sell at a market stall and from a portable van, with an aim to accrue the highest profit margin.
Result: Eventus won, finishing with a $567.60 profit against Pinnacle's $194.70. Eventus gained an advantage by producing their pies (vegetable curry) for less than Pinnacle (roast lamb and potato), sticking to fixed pricing strategies, and by arranging upsells  with free T-shirts. Eventus were cautioned for falsely marketing their pies as 'home-made'.
Winner: Eventus
Reward: Three-course dinner cooked by a French chef.
Brought into the boardroom: Amy, Sam, Morello
Fired: Amy, for not managing her team effectively and for failing to create a structure for their sales strategies.

Week 4
Team changes: Sabrina and Mary-Anne moved to Pinnacle. Blake and Sam moved to Eventus
Project managers:  Heather ('Eventus') and Mary-Anne ('Pinnacle')
Task: Create and market a special function at a pub in the rural town of Mudgee, New South Wales. The teams had to sell tickets to their respective function, with the aim of making the most profit from the night
Result: Pinnacle won by over $1000, finishing with a profit of $3930.05 compared to Eventus's $2814.40. Pinnacle gained an advantage by selling naming and sponsorship rights to the event, raking in additional revenue. Eventus failed to take advantage of the opportunity.  Pinnacle was considered for disqualification as their advertising referred to Sabrina as Miss World Australia, a title she won three years earlier.  The team was spared due to their acknowledgment of the mistake.
Winner: Pinnacle
Reward: A game of golf with Harvey Norman owner Gerry Harvey
Brought into the boardroom: Heather, Gavin and Blake
Fired: Blake, for not stepping up and taking a more active role.

Week 5
Project managers: Sam ('Eventus') and John ('Pinnacle')
Task: Teams had to run a hotel and provide service to their guests for a day. The teams were judged based on their guests feedback.
Result: Eventus won by 3 points, combining to a total of 176 out of a possible 250. Pinnacle scored 173 out of 250. The guests filled out survey forms rating specific tasks out of 10. This would then total to 250, which would determine the outcome of the task.
Winner: Eventus
Reward: Wine tasting at the Winevault by a sommelier.
Brought into the boardroom: John, Mary-Anne and Sabrina
Fired: John for being too passive as team leader, and not ensuring tasks were being correctly carried out.  John also was seen smoking outside the hotel in uniform.

Week 6
Team changes: Heather moved to Pinnacle and Mary-Anne moved to Eventus.
Project managers: Heather ('Pinnacle') and Carmen ('Eventus')
Task: Develop a 30-second television commercial for Microsoft to help sell Windows 7.
Result: Microsoft executives determined the best commercial, as a result, Pinnacle won. Although Pinnacle did not show the product in the ad, it was clear and very much Australian with the strap line "Tell your mates".
Winner: Pinnacle
Reward: Pinnacle got to go to Shangri-La Hotel to meet with the senior executives from Microsoft.
Brought into the boardroom: Carmen and Gavin (by Mark Bouris)
Fired: Carmen for her second loss as project manager and not focusing on the job. In addition, while Carmen was working on the brief, the rest of the members worked extremely well together creating the commercial in the studios. Also, during the project, when Carmen tried to clear the air with Gavin, but failed and Carmen wanted to sack him from the project.

Week 7
Team changes: Men (Gavin, Morello, and Sam) VS Women (Heather, Mary-Anne, and Sabrina).
Project managers: Gavin ('Pinnacle') and Sabrina ('Eventus')
Task: Choose 2 artists and sell their paintings at a gallery. Teams had 3 hours to sell their artists' paintings and make the most money.
Result: Eventus won with sales totalling $30,130 while Pinnacle only sold a total of $5,300. This was partly due to Eventus taking advantage of their artist's existing client list and also due to Pinnacle's over-analysis and commodification of the art they were selling.
Winner: Eventus
Reward: Fitted with new clothes by Herringbone tailors
Brought into the boardroom: Gavin, Morello, and Sam
Fired: Sam for being too inexperienced and being under the radar. After he was fired, Bouris told Sam to come to his office to talk with him after the series was over.
Notes: This is the biggest loss in the history of the Australian edition of The Apprentice so far. Bouris said that Eventus "blitzed" Pinnacle. The difference between the two teams' profits was $24,830.

Week 8
Project managers: Morello ('Pinnacle') and Mary-Anne ('Eventus')
Task: To select and market an unsigned music artist.
Result:  While recording executives had doubts about the image that Pinnacle had come up with for their chosen band, they decided that on the whole Pinnacle had marketed their band better and had an edge in their pitch.
Winner: Pinnacle
Reward: Exclusive live performance by Cassie Davis
Brought into the boardroom: Mary-Anne, Heather & Sabrina
Fired: Sabrina, for failing to take a role to manage conflict between Mary-Anne and Heather

Week 9
Team changes: Morello moved to Eventus. Heather moved to Pinnacle
Project managers:  Gavin ('Pinnacle') and Mary-Anne ('Eventus')
Task: Sell 3 products each, live on TVSN.
Result: Pinnacle went for the strategy to not have little or no communication between each other, to avoid being distracted by the person who's talking to them through their earpiece. That means, the presenters had to memorise all their products. Mary-Anne from Eventus chose poor products for Morello, in particular an infinity dress. In addition, when Morello's demonstration on the vacuum cleaner did not work as planned, Mary-Anne didn't support Morello and laughed at the presentation. These mistakes cost Eventus victory and as a result, Pinnacle won by $93.
Winner: Pinnacle
Brought into the boardroom: Mary-Anne & Morello
Fired: Mary-Anne for poor product choices and not supporting Morello when his live TV demonstration failed.
Notes: Initially, Morello was the project manager for Eventus. After seeing a demonstration of live TV advertising, Mary-Anne decided to become project manager believing she had more to gain than Morello. Morello agreed and allowed Mary-Anne to become project manager. This is the first time a candidate became project manager during a task.

Week 10 (Finale)
Prologue: All contestants were asked the same question "Why should Mark Bouris hire you?" All three candidates were praised for their outstanding performances throughout the season. However, Gavin was criticized for not being able to get along with most of the candidates, as well as not being able to use his teammates to their best extent when he was project manager.
Fired: Gavin, for not being able to bring out the best of his teammates.
Teams:
Pinnacle: Morello with Carmen, Lynton, and Sam
Eventus: Heather with Gavin, Mary-Anne, and Sabrina
Project Managers: Morello ('Pinnacle') and Heather ('Eventus')
Task: Create a fragrance for men – create a name, bottle, print advertisement and a 30-second advertisement.
Result:
Runner-Up: Heather, although her overall performance was great, she wasn't as impressive as Morello.
Hired: Morello

Ratings and reception
The premiere episode had 692,000 viewers nationally, rating third in its timeslot. The second episode sank to fourth for the timeslot with 657,000 viewers nationally tuning in. The third episode rated a better with 823,000 viewers and winning the 9.30 pm timeslot. Viewer numbers remained steady for the fourth episode, with the same numbers as the previous week, 823,000. The fifth episode managed 742,000 viewers, which was followed up by an increasing figures of 832,000 and 874,000 viewers for the sixth and seventh episodes respectively.

Notes

The Celebrity Apprentice Australia

The Celebrity Apprentice version of the series began to air on the Nine Network on 24 October 2011. A second series aired in 2012 and the third in 2013. After a one year break, the series was renewed for a fourth series, which aired in 2015. The series will return for a fifth season in 2021 after a six year hiatus with new CEO, Alan Sugar.

References

External links
Channel Nine, The Apprentice Australia

Australia
Australian television series based on American television series
Nine Network original programming
2000s Australian reality television series
2009 Australian television series debuts
2009 Australian television series endings
2011 Australian television series debuts
Television series by Fremantle (company)
English-language television shows
2010s Australian reality television series